Néstor Isasi (born 9 April 1972) is a Paraguayan former professional footballer who played as a right-back in clubs of Paraguay, Brazil, Chile and Peru. At international level, he made 16 appearances for the Paraguay national team scoring 1 goal.

References

External links
 

1970 births
Living people
Association football fullbacks
Paraguayan footballers
Paraguayan expatriate footballers
Paraguay international footballers
Sport Colombia footballers
Club Guaraní players
São Paulo FC players
America Football Club (RJ) players
Club Olimpia footballers
Cerro Porteño players
Club Nacional footballers
C.D. Antofagasta footballers
Expatriate footballers in Chile
Expatriate footballers in Brazil
Expatriate footballers in Peru